48th meridian may refer to:

48th meridian east, a line of longitude east of the Greenwich Meridian
48th meridian west, a line of longitude west of the Greenwich Meridian